Beni Messous is a commune in Algiers Province and suburb of the city of Algiers in northern Algeria. As of the 2008 census, the commune had a population of 36,191.

Notable people

References

Communes of Algiers Province
Algiers Province